John Franklin Henry was a preacher, farmer, and state legislator in Mississippi. He represented Madison County, Mississippi in the Mississippi House of Representatives in 1884 and 1885.

He was born in Mississippi.

He was lampooned as wanting to exempt Madison County from all laws he does not consider fit.

He served with Samuel W. Lewis in the House and state senator George Harvey as the state senator from Madison County.

See also
 African-American officeholders during and following the Reconstruction era

References

Members of the Mississippi House of Representatives
Date of birth unknown
Date of death unknown